The Hoogovens Wijk aan Zee Steel Chess Tournament 1983 was the 45th edition of the Wijk aan Zee Chess Tournament. It was held in Wijk aan Zee in January 1983. The tournament was won by Ulf Andersson.

{| class="wikitable" style="text-align: center;"
|+ 45th Hoogovens tournament, group A, January 1983, Wijk aan Zee, Netherlands, Category XII (2544)
! !! Player !! Rating !! 1 !! 2 !! 3 !! 4 !! 5 !! 6 !! 7 !! 8 !! 9 !! 10 !! 11 !! 12 !! 13 !! 14 !! Total !! TPR !! Place
|-
|-style="background:#ccffcc;"
| 1 || align="left"| || 2635 ||  || ½ || ½ || 1 || ½ || ½ || 1 || ½ || ½ || ½ || 1 || 1 || ½ || 1 || 9 || 2678 || 1
|-
| 2 || align="left"| || 2595 || ½ ||  || 1 || ½ || ½ || ½ || ½ || ½ || 1 || ½ || 1 || 1 || ½ || ½ || 8½ || 2650 || 2
|-
| 3 || align="left" | || 2585 || ½ || 0 ||  || ½ || ½ || ½ || 0 || 1 || 1 || ½ || 1 || ½ || 1 || 1 || 8 || 2628 || 3–4
|-
| 4 || align="left" | || 2540 || 0 || ½ || ½ ||  || ½ || ½ || 1 || 1 || ½ || ½ || ½ || 1 || ½ || 1 || 8 || 2631 || 3–4
|-
| 5 || align="left" | || 2570 || ½ || ½ || ½ || ½ ||  || ½ || ½ || ½ || 1 || ½ || 0 || 1 || ½ || 1 || 7½ || 2599 || 5
|-
| 6 || align="left" | || 2600 || ½ || ½ || ½ || ½ || ½ ||  || ½ || ½ || 0 || 1 || 1 || 0 || ½ || 1 || 7 || 2569 || 6
|-
| 7 || align="left" | || 2515 || 0 || ½ || 1 || 0 || ½ || ½ ||  || 0 || ½ || 1 || 1 || ½ || ½ || ½ || 6½ || 2546 || 7
|-
| 8 || align="left" | || 2500 || ½ || ½ || 0 || 0 || ½ || ½ || 1 ||  || ½ || ½ || 0 || 1 || 0 || ½ || 5½ || 2490 || 8–10
|-
| 9 || align="left" | || 2495 || ½ || 0 || 0 || ½ || 0 || 1 || ½ || ½ ||  || 1 || 0 || 0 || 1 || ½ || 5½ || 2491 || 8–10
|-
| 10 || align="left" | || 2445 || ½ || ½ || ½ || ½ || ½ || 0 || 0 || ½ || 0 ||  || ½ || ½ || 1 || ½ || 5½ || 2495 || 8–10
|- 
| 11 || align="left" | || 2600 || 0 || 0 || 0 || ½ || 1 || 0 || 0 || 1 || 1 || ½ ||  || 1 || 1 || 0 || 5 || 2453 || 11–12
|-
| 12 || align="left" | || 2530 || 0 || 0 || ½ || 0 || 0 || 1 || ½ || 0 || 1 || ½ || 0 ||  || ½ || 1 || 5 || 2458 || 11–12
|-
| 13 || align="left" ||| 2570 || ½ || ½ || 0 || ½ || ½ || ½ || ½ || 1 || 0 || 0 || 0 || ½ ||  || 0 || 4½ || 2432 || 13–14
|-
| 14 || align="left" | || 2435 || 0 || ½ || 0 || 0 || 0 || 0 || ½ || ½ || ½ || ½ || 1 || 0 || 1 ||  || 4½ || 2442 || 13–14
|}

{| class="wikitable" style="text-align: center;"
|+ 45th Hoogovens tournament, group B, January 1983, Wijk aan Zee, Netherlands
! !! Player !! 1 !! 2 !! 3 !! 4 !! 5 !! 6 !! 7 !! 8 !! 9 !! 10 !! Total !! Place
|-
| 1 || align="left"| ||  || 1 || ½ || 0 || ½ || ½ || 1 || 1 || 1 || 1 || 6½ || 1
|-
| 2 || align="left"| || 0 ||  || 1 || ½ || 1 || 1 || 0 || ½ || ½ || 1 || 5½ || 2
|-
| 3 || align="left" | || ½ || 0 ||  || ½ || ½ || 0 || 1 || 1 || ½ || 1 || 5 || 3–5
|-
| 4 || align="left" | || 1 || ½ || ½ ||  || ½ || 0 || 0 || 1 || ½ || 1 || 5 || 3–5
|-
| 5 || align="left" | || ½ || 0 || ½ || ½ ||  || 0 || 1 || 1 || 1 || ½ || 5 || 3–5
|-
| 6 || align="left" | || ½ || 0 || 1 || 1 || 1 ||  || 0 || ½ || ½ || 0 || 4½ || 6–7 
|-
| 7 || align="left" | || 0 || 1 || 0 || 1 || 0 || 1 ||  || ½ || 1 || 0 || 4½ || 6–7
|-
| 8 || align="left" | || 0 || ½ || 0 || 0 || 0 || ½ || ½ ||  || 1 || 1 || 3½ || 8
|-
| 9 || align="left" | || 0 || ½ || ½ || ½ || 0 || ½ || 0 || 0 ||  || 1 || 3 || 9
|-
| 10 || align="left" | || 0 || 0 || 0 || 0 || ½ || 1 || 1 || 0 || 0 ||   || 2½ || 10
|}

References

Tata Steel Chess Tournament
1983 in chess
1983 in Dutch sport